The Zeepipe is a natural gas transportation system to transport North Sea natural gas to the receiving terminal at Zeebrugge in Belgium.

The total costs of Zeepipe system is around 24.2 billion NOK. It is owned by Gassled partners and operated by Gassco. The technical service provider is Statoil. The Zeebrugge receiving terminal is owned by Fluxys (51%) and Gassled partners (49%).

Zeepipe I
The Zeepipe I pipeline was commissioned on 1 October 1993. The  pipeline runs from Sleipner field to Zeebrugge. At the time of construction, it was the longest and largest offshore pipeline in the world. It was more than twice as long as the next largest single-section offshore pipeline in the world.

Originally, there was a plan to build an intermediate service platform to the pipeline to tie in future compression facilities and to enable the pipeline to be pigged in two sections.  However, due to technological development it is possible to serve the pipeline as one pigging segment and the need for the service platform was eliminated.

The second section of Zeepipe I consists of a  pipeline from Draupner S to Sleipner. It links Zeepipe with Statpipe. 

The contract for pre-commissioning and commissioning of Zeepipe 1 was awarded to Halliburton Oilfield Services Inc.  Halliburton awarded engineering and procurement sub-contracts to Brown and Root Engineering Ltd. The pipeline was laid by Semac 1 and Castoro Sei pipe-laying ships.

Zeepipe IIA
The capacity of Zeepipe II A is 26.3 billion cubic meters per year.

Zeepipe IIB

References

External links

 Zeepipe (Gassco website)

Energy infrastructure completed in 1993
North Sea energy
Natural gas pipelines in Belgium
Natural gas pipelines in Norway
Zeebrugge
Pipelines under the North Sea
1993 establishments in Belgium
1993 establishments in Norway